The 2011–12 Ligue 2 season was the 73rd since its establishment. The previous season's champions was Evian. The league schedule was announced on 31 March 2011 and the fixtures were determined on 10 June. The season began on 29 July and ended on 18 May 2012. The winter break was in effect from 21 December to 14 January.

Bastia clinched the second division title on 1 May 2012 with three matches to spare after defeating Metz 3–0 at the Stade Armand Cesari. The title is the club's second overall in the division having won the league previously in the 1967–68 season. Bastia will be making its return to the first division after a seven-year absence and will be entering Ligue 1 on a run of two consecutive promotions. The club had earned promotion to Ligue 2 after winning the 2010–11 edition of the Championnat National.

Reims and Troyes became the second and third club, respectively, to earn promotion to Ligue 1 alongside the champions Bastia. Both clubs achieved promotion with one game to spare following league victories on 11 May 2012, which positioned each club in second and third place permanently. Reims, which is a six-time Ligue 1 champion, will be returning to the first division after over 33 years playing in the lower divisions. During those 33 years, the club underwent liquidation and had all aspects of the club (its records, trophies, etc.) auctioned off. Troyes will be returning to Ligue 1 after a four-year stint in Ligue 2.

Teams 

There were three promoted teams from the Championnat National, the third division of French football, replacing the three teams that were relegated from Ligue 2 following the 2010–11 season. A total of 20 teams competed in the league with three clubs suffering relegation to the Championnat National. All clubs that secured Ligue 2 status for the season were subject to approval by the DNCG before becoming eligible to participate.

Arles-Avignon was the first club to suffer relegation from the first division to Ligue 2. The club's impending drop occurred on 17 April 2011 following the team's 2–0 defeat to AS Monaco. The negative result made it mathematically impossible for Arles to seize the 17th position in the table, which would have allowed the club to remain in Ligue 1. Arles-Avignon made its return to Ligue 2 after only a year's spell in the top division of French football. On 15 May, Lens were relegated from the first division to Ligue 2 after its 1–1 draw with Monaco. Lens returned to Ligue 2 for the first time since the 2008–09 season when the club finished as champions of the league. On the final day of the Ligue 1 season, Monaco suffered relegation to the second division after losing 2–0 to Lyon. The club's appearance in Ligue 2 was its first since 1976.

Bastia became the first team to achieve promotion to Ligue 2 from the Championnat National after drawing 1–1 with Fréjus Saint-Raphaël on 22 April. Coupled with fourth-place Strasbourg's draw with Luzenac on the same day, the results made it mathematically impossible for the Alsatians to catch Bastia in the standings. Amiens achieved promotion from National to Ligue 2 on 13 May following its 2–1 home win against Guingamp. Amiens made its return to the second division after spending two seasons in the Championnat National. Guingamp became the final club to earn promotion to National after its 2–0 away win over Rouen. Similar to Bastia, Guingamp made its return to Ligue 2 after only one season in the third division.

Teams relegated to Ligue 2
 AS Monaco
 Lens
 Arles-Avignon

Teams promoted to Ligue 2
 Bastia
 Amiens
 Guingamp

DNCG rulings 

On 1 July 2011, following a preliminary review of each club's administrative and financial accounts in Ligue 2, the DNCG ruled that Tours would be relegated to the Championnat National. Tours president, Frédéric Sebag, confirmed the demotion was as a result of the club's failure to "balance its books". Sebag also confirmed that the club would be appealing the ruling. On 13 July, Tours successfully appealed to the DNCG and was subsequently reinstated into Ligue 2.

Stadia and locations

Personnel and kits 

Note: Flags indicate national team as has been defined under FIFA eligibility rules. Players and managers may hold more than one non-FIFA nationality.

1Subject to change during the season.

Managerial changes

Ownership changes

League table

Results

Statistics

Top goalscorers

Last updated: 18 May 2012
Source: Official Goalscorers' Standings

Assists table

Last updated: 18 May 2012
Source: Official Assists' Table

Scoring 
First goal of the season: Yoann Tougzhar for Amiens against Troyes (29 July 2011)
First own goal of the season: Nicolas Pallois for Clermont against Laval (29 July 2011)
Highest scoring game: 7 goals 
Metz 2–5 Guingamp (4 May 2012)
Widest winning margin: 5 goals
Nantes 5–0 Amiens (27 April 2012)
Most goals scored in a match by a single team: 5 goals 
Tours 5–1 Guingamp (16 December 2011)
Arles-Avignon 1–5 Istres (20 December 2011)
Bastia 5–1 Troyes (4 February 2012)
Laval 5–1 Sedan (6 April 2012)
Nantes 5–0 Amiens (27 April 2012)
Metz 2–5 Guingamp (4 May 2012)

Discipline 
Worst overall disciplinary record (1 pt per yellow card, 3 pts per red card):
 Arles-Avignon – 59 points (44 yellow & 5 red cards)
Best overall disciplinary record: 33 points
 Boulogne (30 yellow & 1 red cards)
Most yellow cards (club): 46
Amiens
Most red cards (club): 7 
Istres

Awards

Annual awards

UNFP Player of the Year 
The nominees for the UNFP Ligue 2 Player of the Year award was awarded to Bastia midfielder Jérôme Rothen.

UNFP Goalkeeper of the Year 
The UNFP Goalkeeper of the Year award was awarded to Macedo Novaes of Bastia.

UNFP Manager of the Year 
The UNFP Manager of the Year award went to Frédéric Hantz of Bastia.

UNFP Team of the Year 
The UNFP selected the following 11 players for the Ligue 2 Team of the Year:

Goalkeeper
  Macedo Novaes (Bastia)

Defenders
  Kassim Abdallah (Sedan)
  Anthony Weber (Reims)
  Mickaël Tacalfred (Reims)
  Féthi Harek (Bastia)

Midfielders
  Sadio Diallo (Bastia)
  Wahbi Khazri (Bastia)
  Romain Alessandrini (Clermont)
  Jérôme Rothen (Bastia)

Forwards
  Ryan Mendes (Le Havre)
  Kamel Ghilas (Reims)

List of 2011–12 transfers

References

External links 

 Official site

 

2011-12
2
Fra